Bossa Nova is an album by American jazz saxophonist Eddie Harris, featuring some early compositions by Lalo Schifrin, recorded in 1962 and released on the Vee-Jay label.

Reception
The Allmusic review states "far from being a casual response to a fad, this is a great record, one where Harris came to his own comfortable accommodation with the Brazilian idiom".

Track listing
All compositions by Lalo Schifrin except as indicated
 "Mima" - 7:39 
 "Lolita Marie" (Eddie Harris) - 4:54 
 "Cev y Mar" (Johnny Alf) - 8:29 
 "Whispering Bossa Nova" -5:42 
 "Samba Para Dos" - 5:29 
 "Tel Eco Teco No. 2" (Nelsinado O. Magalhaes) - 3:28

Personnel
Eddie Harris - tenor saxophone
Lalo Schifrin - piano, arranger
Jimmy Raney - guitar
Art Davis - bass
Chuck Lampkin - drums
Jack del Rio, Osvaldo Cigno - Latin percussion
George Okamoto, Ray London - cover illustration

References 

Eddie Harris albums
1963 albums
Albums arranged by Lalo Schifrin
Vee-Jay Records albums